Chợ Lách is a rural district (huyện) of Bến Tre province in the Mekong Delta region of Vietnam.

As of 2018 the district had a population of 147,289. The district covers an area of 189 km2. The district capital lies at Chợ Lách.  The district capital lies on Provincial Highway 57 and is 45 km west of Bến Tre and 20 km east of Vĩnh Long.

The district capital was formed by Decree No. 41/HĐBT on March 14, 1984 by the Vietnamese Cabinet. The capital comprises the following hamlets: Sơn Quy, two thirds of Bình An and one sixth of Phụng Châu of Sơn Định commune. Chợ Lách's name means "Lách Market", and is derived from the presence of a market in the area in the vicinity of many "lau lách" trees.

References

Districts of Bến Tre province